George M. Santangelo is an American genomicist and data scientist. He is the director of the Office of Portfolio Analysis at the National Institutes of Health.

Education and career 
Santangelo received his bachelor's degree from the University of Pennsylvania, and his Ph.D. from Yale University. In 2011, he was appointed as director of the newly formed Office of Portfolio Analysis at the National Institutes of Health. Santangelo oversees a team of analysts, data scientists, and software developers to enable data-driven decision-making.

Selected works

References 

Living people
Year of birth missing (living people)
National Institutes of Health people
Yale University alumni
University of Pennsylvania alumni
Data scientists
American geneticists
20th-century American scientists
21st-century American scientists